The 2017 UEFA Regions' Cup was the 10th edition of the UEFA Regions' Cup, a football competition for amateur teams in Europe organized by UEFA.

Zagreb, which lost to Leinster/Munster (Eastern Region) in the previous edition's final, defeated Munster/Connacht (Region 2), also from the Republic of Ireland, in this edition's final to become the first team from Croatia to win the UEFA Regions' Cup.

Teams
A total of 38 teams entered the tournament. Each of the 54 UEFA member associations could enter a regional amateur representative team which qualified through a national qualifying competition, or when applicable, their national amateur representative team.

Teams were ranked according to their UEFA coefficients, computed based on results of the last three seasons, to decide on the round they entered. The top 30 teams entered the intermediate round, and the bottom 8 teams (ranked 31–38) entered the preliminary round.

The draws for the preliminary round and intermediate round were held on 3 December 2015, 14:00 CET (UTC+1), at the UEFA headquarters in Nyon, Switzerland. The mechanism of the draws for each round was as follows:
In the preliminary round, the eight teams were drawn into two groups of four without any seeding.
In the intermediate round, the 32 teams were drawn into eight groups of four with the following seeding:
Groups 1–2 contained two teams from Pot A (teams ranked 1–16), one team from Pot B (teams ranked 17–30), and one preliminary round winner (preliminary round Group A winner assigned to Group 1, preliminary round Group B winner assigned to Group 2)
Groups 3–8 contained two teams from Pot A and two teams from Pot B.

Format
In the preliminary round and intermediate round, each group is played as a round-robin mini-tournament at one of the teams selected as hosts after the draw.

In the final tournament, the eight qualified teams play a group stage (two groups of four) followed by the final between the group winners, at a host selected by UEFA from one of the teams.

Tiebreakers
In the preliminary round, intermediate round, and group stage of the final tournament, teams are ranked according to points (3 points for a win, 1 point for a draw, 0 points for a loss), and if tied on points, the following tiebreaking criteria are applied, in the order given, to determine the rankings (regulations Articles 14.01, 14.02, 16.01 and 16.02):
Points in head-to-head matches among tied teams;
Goal difference in head-to-head matches among tied teams;
Goals scored in head-to-head matches among tied teams;
If more than two teams are tied, and after applying criteria 1 to 3, a subset of teams are still tied, criteria 1 to 3 are reapplied exclusively to this subset of teams;
Goal difference in all group matches;
Goals scored in all group matches;
If only two teams have the same number of points, and they met in the last round of the group and are tied after applying criteria 1 to 6, their rankings are determined by a penalty shoot-out (not used if more than two teams have the same number of points, or if their rankings are not relevant for qualification for the next stage);
Disciplinary points (red card = 3 points, yellow card = 1 point, expulsion for two yellow cards in one match = 3 points);
Drawing of lots.

Preliminary round
The two group winners advance to the intermediate round to join the 30 teams which receive byes to the intermediate round. Matches must be played between 1 May and 31 July 2016.

All times are CEST (UTC+2).

Group A

Group B

Intermediate round
The eight group winners advance to the final tournament. Matches must be played between 15 August and 15 December 2016.

Times up to 29 October 2016 are CEST (UTC+2), thereafter times are CET (UTC+1).

Group 1

Group 2

Group 3

Group 4

Group 5

Group 6

Group 7

Group 8

Final tournament
The hosts of the final tournament was selected by UEFA from the eight qualified teams, with UEFA announcing on 21 December 2016 that it would be hosted in Istanbul, Turkey between 1 and 9 July 2017.

The draw for the final tournament was held on 2 March 2017, 17:00 TRT (UTC+3), at the Turkish Football Federation headquarters in Istanbul. The eight teams were drawn into two groups of four without any seeding, except that the hosts were assigned to position A1 in the draw. Based on the decisions taken by the UEFA Emergency Panel, teams from Russia and Ukraine would not be drawn into the same group. The final tournament schedule was confirmed on 4 May 2017.

The two group winners advance to the final, while the two group runners-up receive bronze medals. In the final, extra time and penalty shoot-out are used to decide the winner if necessary.

All times are CEST (UTC+2); local times, TRT (UTC+3), are in parentheses.

Group A

Group B

Final

Top goalscorers

References

External links
UEFA Regions' Cup
UEFA Regions' Cup history: 2016/17

2017
Regions